The Nokia 6500 is a mobile phone announced on 19 November 2001 by Nokia and released in early 2002. It had a flip-down form factor. The Nokia 6500 was based on the similar 6510 which had a candybar form factor.

Related Devices
Nokia 6510
Nokia 8310

References

Mobile phones introduced in 2002
6500